Daniel Agüero (born 1997) is a Peruvian artistic gymnast.

In 2017, he competed at the South American Artistic Gymnastics Championships held in Cochabamba, Bolivia. Two years later, in 2019, he competed at the 2019 South American Artistic Gymnastics Championships held in Santiago, Chile.

He won the silver medal in the men's vault event at the 2018 Pacific Rim Gymnastics Championships held in Medellín, Colombia.

References

External links 
 

Living people
1997 births
Peruvian male artistic gymnasts
21st-century Peruvian people
Sportspeople from Lima